Rambo III is a series of video games based on the film Rambo III (1988). Like in the film, their main plots center on former Vietnam-era Green Beret John Rambo being recalled up to duty one last time to rescue his former commander, Colonel Sam Trautman, who was captured during a covert operation mission in Soviet-controlled Afghanistan. Taito released an arcade video game based on the film. The console versions were developed and published by Sega, the IBM PC compatible version was developed by Ocean and published by Taito, and Ocean developed and published the other home computer versions: Atari ST, Amiga, Spectrum, C64, Amstrad CPC.

Ports
The Master System version, released in 1988, is a light gun shooter along the lines of Operation Wolf. The Light Phaser is supported. 

The Mega Drive version, released in 1989, follows Rambo in six missions, in each one with various objectives. Besides finding the exit of the level, in some missions, prisoners must be freed or enemy ammunition supplies destroyed. Rambo is controlled from an overhead perspective and has several weapons at his disposal. Besides a machine gun that never runs out of ammo, he can use a knife for close range kills, set off timed bombs and use his famous longbow with explosive arrows. Ammunition for the bow and the bombs is limited and can be collected from dead enemies. Rambo himself, on the other hand, is vulnerable and can be killed after one hit.

After some of the missions, the perspective switches to a view behind Rambo and additional boss fights take place. Soviet tanks or helicopters must be destroyed using the bow. While aiming the bow, Rambo cannot move, but otherwise he can hide behind rocks or other obstacles from enemy fire. This is reminiscent of the Taito arcade game of the same name, which also had the player firing into the screen at helicopters and jeeps, but instead of just a single segment after each stage, the whole game is played out in this perspective.

The ZX Spectrum, Atari ST, Amiga, Commodore 64, and Amstrad CPC versions have three missions, and vary drastically from the console versions.

Reception 

Computer and Video Games reviewed the Sega Master System version, stating this "Operation Wolf clone is definitely the best Light Phaser game available on the Sega."

UK magazine Mean Machines rated the game at 86% and described it as "All the fun and frolics of an abattoir, with plenty of exciting and addictive action."

References

External links 
 
 
 
 
 
 
 Rambo III on the Amiga at The Hall of Light (HOL)

1989 video games
Action video games
Amiga games
Amstrad CPC games
Arcade video games
Arcade-only video games
Atari ST games
Cold War video games
DOS games
Soviet–Afghan War video games
Commodore 64 games
Light gun games
MSX games
Ocean Software games
Rambo (franchise) video games
Romstar games
Master System games
Master System-only games
Sega Genesis games
Sega Genesis-only games
Video games based on films
Video games based on adaptations
Video games scored by Masahiko Takaki
Video games set in Afghanistan
ZX Spectrum games
Taito arcade games
Cabal shooters
Video games developed in Japan
Video games developed in the United Kingdom